The 2008 Colorado Rapids season was the thirteenth season of the team's existence.  Colorado began their season with 4-0 victory over the Los Angeles Galaxy and ended a 1-1 draw against Real Salt Lake.  They finished 4th in the Western Conference and 9th overall, 1 point behind the New York Red Bulls for the final Wild Card Playoff spot.  In the U.S. Open Cup Qualifying, Colorado defeated the Los Angeles Galaxy 1-0 before losing in Kansas City in a penalty shootout.

Results by round

Friendly

MLS

March

April

May

June

July

August

September

October

U.S. Open Cup Qualifying

Standings

Conference

Overall

References

External links 
2008 Schedule

2008
Colorado Rapids
Colorado Rapids
Colorado Rapids